It's a Gift (1923) is a short silent movie comedy film featuring Snub Pollard and directed by Hugh Fay.

Plot
A group of oil magnates are trying to think of new ways to attract business. One of them suggests that they contact an eccentric inventor (Pollard), who has devised a new gasoline substitute.

The inventor himself lives in a home filled with his strange inventions. When he gets the message from the oil company, he is excited about the opportunity to demonstrate his innovation, and jumps into his "magnet car".

In popular culture
The most famous sequence in the film shows Pollard using a large magnet to put his car into motion.

The sequence in which Pollard appears from around the corner and observes the multi-car collision was used on Sesame Street in an educational film about traffic lights, which premiered in the first episode of the show's second season in the fall of 1970.

Cast
 Snub Pollard ...  Inventor Pollard 
 Marie Mosquini ...  The Girl 
 William Gillespie ...  Weller Pump, oil executive 
 Wallace Howe ...  Customer 
 Mark Jones ...  Swindler 
 Eddie Dunn ...  Postman (uncredited)

References

External links
 
 It's a Gift at SilentEra

1923 films
1923 comedy films
1923 short films
Silent American comedy films
American silent short films
American black-and-white films
Articles containing video clips
Films about scientists
Surviving American silent films
American comedy short films
1920s American films